Scincus conirostris, the sandfish skink, is a species of lizard which is found in Saudi Arabia, Iran, Oman, and the United Arab Emirates.

References

conirostris
Reptiles described in 1881
Taxa named by William Thomas Blanford